Euphaedra mambili, the Mambili euphaedra, is a butterfly in the family Nymphalidae. It is found in eastern Nigeria, Cameroon and the Republic of the Congo. The habitat consists of forests.

References

Butterflies described in 2001
mambili